Dieudonné Ndayisaba Ndizeye (born 14 October 1996) is a Rwandan basketball player for REG and the Rwanda national team. He is a three-time RBL champion and a one-time league MVP winner in 2019. Ndizeye has played two seasons in the BAL as well.

Professional career
Ndizeye started his career with IPRC-Kigali in the National Basketball League in 2015.

In 2017, Ndizeye joined Patriots BBC. He was named the national league MVP time in 2018–19 season.

In November 2021, he joined the South Sudanese side Cobra Sport to play for them in the 2022 BAL qualifying tournaments. He helped Cobra qualify for the BAL for the first time.

On February 14, 2022, Ndizeye signed with REG to play in the 2022 BAL season. He stayed on the Patriots team for the Rwanda Basketball League games.

National team career
Since 2017, Ndizeye has been a member of the Rwanda national basketball team and has played in qualifying tournaments with his country.

BAL career statistics

|-
|style="text-align:left;"|2021
|style="text-align:left;"|Patriots
| 6 || 6 || 28.4 || .338 || .343 || .750 || 5.0 || 1.8 || .7 || .5|| 11.5
|-
|style="text-align:left;"|2022
|style="text-align:left;"|REG
| 6 || 6 || 28.1 || .386 || .342 || 1.000 || 5.8 || 2.0 || .7 || .5 || 12.7

References

Rwandan men's basketball players
Patriots BBC players
1996 births
Small forwards
REG BBC players
IPRC-Kigali basketball players
Living people
Cobra Sport players